The following highways are numbered 63. For a list of roads called N63, see List of N63 roads.

Argentina
 Buenos Aires Provincial Route 63

Australia
 Gregory Developmental Road - Queensland State Route 63

Canada
 Alberta Highway 63
 Newfoundland and Labrador Route 63
  Ontario Highway 63

India
 National Highway 63 (India)

Iran
 Road 63

Korea, South
National Route 63

Malaysia
  Malaysia Federal Route 63

New Zealand
 New Zealand State Highway 63

Philippines
 N63 highway (Philippines)

United Kingdom
 A63 road (Leeds-Kingston upon Hull)

United States
 Interstate 63 (proposed)
 U.S. Route 63
 Alabama State Route 63
 Arizona State Route 63 (former)
 California State Route 63
 Colorado State Highway 63
 Connecticut Route 63
 Florida State Road 63
 Georgia State Route 63
 Georgia State Route 63 (1921–1967) (former)
 Hawaii Route 63
 Illinois Route 63 (former)
 Indiana State Road 63
 K-63 (Kansas highway)
 Kentucky Route 63
 Louisiana Highway 63
 Louisiana State Route 63 (former)
 Maryland Route 63
 Massachusetts Route 63
 M-63 (Michigan highway)
Minnesota:
 Minnesota State Highway 63 (1920) (former)
 Minnesota State Highway 63 (1934) (former)
 County Road 63 (Dakota County, Minnesota)
 Mississippi Highway 63
Missouri Route 63 (1922) (former)
 Nebraska Highway 63
 Nevada State Route 63 (former)
 New Hampshire Route 63
 New Jersey Route 63
 County Route 63 (Bergen County, New Jersey)
 New Mexico State Road 63
 New York State Route 63
County Route 63B (Cayuga County, New York)
 County Route 63 (Chemung County, New York)
 County Route 63 (Dutchess County, New York)
 County Route 63 (Livingston County, New York)
 County Route 63 (Nassau County, New York)
 County Route 63 (Onondaga County, New York)
 County Route 63 (Orleans County, New York)
 County Route 63 (Putnam County, New York)
 County Route 63 (Rensselaer County, New York)
 County Route 63 (Suffolk County, New York)
 County Route 63 (Warren County, New York)
 County Route 63 (Westchester County, New York)
 North Carolina Highway 63
 North Dakota Highway 63 (former)
 Ohio State Route 63
 Oklahoma State Highway 63
 Pennsylvania Route 63
 South Carolina Highway 63
 South Dakota Highway 63
 Tennessee State Route 63
 Texas State Highway 63
 Texas State Highway Spur 63
 Farm to Market Road 63 (former)
 Texas Park Road 63
 Utah State Route 63
 Vermont Route 63
 Virginia State Route 63
 West Virginia Route 63
 Wisconsin Highway 63 (former)

Territories
 Puerto Rico Highway 63
 U.S. Virgin Islands Highway 63

See also
List of highways numbered 63A
A63 (disambiguation)